The 1997–98 Turkmenistan Higher League (Ýokary Liga) season was the sixth season of Turkmenistan's professional football league. Eight teams competed in 1997. Köpetdag Aşgabat won the championship with 4 matches to spare, having a 16-point lead over Nisa Aşgabat.

Results
Note: The final results are unavailable for this season; the table below may be missing data.

External links
 

Ýokary Liga seasons
Turk
1997 in Turkmenistani football
1998 in Turkmenistani football